The Government of the Republic of Slovenia exercises executive authority in Slovenia pursuant to the Constitution and the laws of Slovenia. It is also the highest administrative authority in Slovenia.

The government carries out the country's domestic and foreign policy, shaped by the National Assembly; it directs and coordinates the work of government institutions and bears full responsibility for everything occurring within the authority of executive power. The government, headed by the Prime Minister, thus represents the country's political leadership and makes decisions in the name of the whole executive power.

The following duties are attributed to the government:

 executes the domestic and foreign policies of the state; 
 directs and co-ordinates the activities of government agencies;
 administers the implementation of laws, resolutions of the National Assembly, and legislation of the President of the Republic of Slovenia; 
 introduces bills and submits international treaties to the National Assembly for ratification and denunciation; 
 prepares the draft of the state budget and submits it to the National Assembly, administers the implementation of the state budget and presents a report on the performance of the state budget to the National Assembly; 
 issues regulations and orders based on and for the implementation of the law; 
 manages relations with other states; 
 performs other duties which the Constitution and the laws vest in the Government of the Republic.

Statistics 

The longest-serving Prime Minister to date was Janez Drnovšek who held the post for ten years and 45 days (3,695 days) between the years 1992 and 2002, followed by Janez Janša who ruled for over seven years (2,663 days). He also holds the longest uninterrupted mandate of 2,180 days between the years 2004 and 2008. The shortest term is held by Andrej Bajuk, who was in the position for 176 days. Alenka Bratušek is the first woman to take the position of the Prime Minister of Slovenia and, until now, the only one to do so. The first minority cabinet was led by Borut Pahor in 2012 as two coalition parties, Zares and DeSUS, left the coalition. The first preliminary elections followed just a few months after the coalition's break up. Since then, Slovenia witnessed its second preliminary election in 2014, when Janša's second cabinet broke up after DeSUS and DL left the coalition and the cabinet found itself in the minority. Another snap election was called in 2018, before in 2022, the first regularly scheduled parliamentary election since 2008 was held.

Current government

The composition of the current Slovenian government (as of August 2022) is the following:

Government history

First Slovenian Government in the State of Slovenes, Croats and Serbs

Slovenian National Council was the first executive council established in Slovenia, though it never became Slovenian parliament. The Council named on the 31. of October 1918 the first Slovene National government. Knight Josip Pogačnik was named as the first Slovene prime minister in the State of Slovenes, Croats and Serbs (SHS). The government, which had full organisational capabilities, took care of peace and order, economy, transport, education, food, science, culture and other public affairs. The Cabinet consisted of 12 departments called poverjeništva, that were led by representatives of all major Slovenian parties at the time. The government was active until 20. January 1919, when it was relieved by the new government of Kingdom of Serbs, Croats and Slovenes in Belgrade.

List of governments of the Republic of Slovenia

Assembly of Socialist Republic of Slovenia in 1990 accepted two new acts that allowed the unification of political parties in the Republic and elections to new assemblies. The president of the Assembly Miran Potrč determined the date of the first democratic elections in Socialist Republic of Slovenia to be on the 8 of April 1990. Since 16 May 1990 (the first multi-party parliamentary election held following the 45-year Communist rule), the Republic of Slovenia has had a total of twelve governments headed by eight different prime ministers. The prime minister in the first government of the Republic of Slovenia was Lojze Peterle. That government was formed by the coalition Democratic Opposition of Slovenia (Demos), which composed of five parties: Slovene Christian Democrats (SKD), (Slovenian Social Democratic Union (SDZS), Slovenian Democratic Union (SDZ), Farmers' Alliance (SLS) and Greens of Slovenia (ZS). Since the first government eight governments have been formed by the left parties and four by the right political parties.

Golob Government (2022-present) 

The cabinet was sworn on 1 June 2022.

Janša III Government (2020-2022) 

The cabinet was sworn on 13 March 2020.

Šarec Government (2018-2020) 

The cabinet was sworn on 13 September 2018.

Cerar Government (2014-2018) 

The cabinet was sworn on 18 September 2014.

Bratušek Government (2013-2014) 

The cabinet was sworn on 20 March 2013.

Janša II Government (2012-2013) 

The cabinet was sworn in on 10 February 2012.

Pahor Government (2008–2012)

Janša I Government (2004–2008)

Rop Government (2002–2004)

Bajuk Government 2000

Drnovšek Governments (1992–2002)

Peterle Government (1990–1992)

References

 

Organizations based in Ljubljana